Perneet Chauhan  is an Indian film, theatre,  and television actress. She starred in Do Dil Bandhe Ek Dori Se and  Love Ne Mila Di Jodi.

Filmography

References

External links
 Perneet Chauhan on IMDb

Living people
Year of birth missing (living people)
Indian television actresses
Indian film actresses
Actresses from Goa